"Tokyo Bambi" is a single released by The Pillows on January 30, 2008. Its limited edition comes with DVD containing the music videos for the title track and the B-side "Go! Go! Jupiter". The title "Tokyo Bambi" and the cover art contain a reference to the eponymous deer from the book Bambi, A Life in the Woods and the film Bambi.

Track listing 
 "Tokyo Bambi"
 "Go! Go! Jupiter"
 "Across the Metropolis"

Personnel
 Sawao Yamanaka – vocals, guitar
 Yoshiaki Manabe – guitar
 Shinichirou Sato – drums
 Jun Suzuki – bass
 Nargo – horn section

Chart performance

2008 singles
The Pillows songs
2008 songs
Avex Trax singles
Song articles with missing songwriters